Kristina Olegovna Tkach  (born 19 January 1999) is a Russian professional pool player. She became the 2017 WPA World Nine-ball Junior Championship winner, defeating Lee Woo-jin in the final 9–6. Tkach is a four time European champion having won the eight-ball event in 2016 and 2019, as well as Straight pool in 2017 and 2019. In addition, she is a nine-time Junior European Champion.

Tkach is a regular player on the Euro Tour events, reaching the Tour number one in 2016. She is the second most successful player of all time on the tour behind Jasmin Ouschan, having won seven events beginning with the 2016 North Cyprus Open.

Career 
Kristina Tkach was born 19 January 1999 in Moscow, Russia. Tkach began playing in 2008, being supported by her parents to take up the game.

Early career (2008–2014)
Before turning 10 years of age, Tkach finished third at the Russian Under 18 Championship 2008 in eight-ball. Tkach then moved in 2009 to play straight pool competing in the Moscow Under 18 City Championship final, finishing as runner-up and also reaching the semi-finals in the women's competition nine-ball.  The following year she won the junior women in nine-ball and ten-ball her first two out of a total of twenty titles at Moscow Under 18 Championships. Tkach also competed in the ladies event at the championship where she lost in the final 18–50 against Anna Mashirina.

In 2012 Tkach played in her first European Youth Championships, at which she was the youngest medal winner at 13 years and 7 months. She had reached the semi-finals in the eight-ball event losing to Kamila Khodjaeva. In November 2012, she reached her first adult Russian championship semi-final, in both the straight pool and eight-ball events. In the European youth Championship 2013 she reached the semi-finals in both the ten-ball and nine-ball disciplines. In October 2013, she won three of the four titles at the Moscow City Championship  in the women's events. A month later she reached her first adult Russian championship finals, but lost to Anna Maschirina (ten-ball) and Daria Sirotina (nine-ball).  In addition, she finished in straight and in eight-ball in third place, reaching the semi-final or better in all five events.

Euro Tour number 1 (2014–present)
In March 2014, she played in her first Women's European Championship. After she was eliminated in both the straight and ten-ball events in the preliminary round, she reached the quarter-finals in the eight-ball, in which she against defeated by the Kamila Khodjaeva 5–6. After the European Championships, Tkach played in her first Euro Tour event, won her first medal, by finishing second at the 2014 North Cyprus Open, being defeated by Jasmin Ouschan. In August, Tkach won the eight-ball Junior European Pool Championship with a 5–4 final victory against Kamila Khodjaeva.

At the beginning of 2015, Tkach became the Russian under-18 champion in all four disciplines for the first time. In November 2015 she reached the WPA World Junior Championship the quarter-final before losing to Chinas Jiang Teng. Despite being eliminated in the first round of the straight pool event and in the ten-ball in the quarter-finals, she reached the final of eight-ball event of the 2015 European championships. She won the match 6–3 against Kateryna Polowyntschuk, to win her first European Championship. In June 2016, she won the 2016 North Cyprus Open, defeating Marharyta Fjafilawa 7–3, to win her first Euro Tour tournament. At the 2016 Junior European Championships won three events, defeating Diana Khodjaeva 5–3 and 6–5, (ten-ball, nine-ball) and Dina Fatychowa 5–1, (eight-ball).  A few days later, she won 7–4 in the final against Katarzyna Wesołowska to win the 2016 Albanian Open. The win made Tkach the number one-ranked player on the Euro Tour.

The following season Tkach won the 2016 Portugal Open against Ina Kaplan 7–4 winning her third Euro Tour event in a row. During the 2016 Kremlin World Cup, Tkach, along with Daria Sirotina was the only woman the round of the last 32 where she lost to Denis Grabe. She won her fifth Euro Tour medal at the 2017 Portugal Open losing 3–7 to Ouschan in the final. After finishing second in the one-year ranking of the Euro Tour after the Portugal Open, she qualified for the nine-ball Competition the World Games 2017. At the Games in Wrocław she lost in the quarter-finals against the subsequent gold medal winner Chen Siming. In the European Youth Championship 2017 she again won all three competitions for junior women. In the finals she defeated Daryna Sirantschuk (5–0, ten-ball), Weronika Karwik (5–0, eight-ball), Valery Trushevskaya (6–1, nine-ball). In November 2017, Tkach entered the 2017 WPA World Nine-ball Junior Championship where she reached the final before defeating Lee Woo-jin to become junior world champion. She was the fifth European and the second Russian, after Natalja Seroschtan (2013) to win the title.

In April 2019, she won the Women's Pro Players Championship and was presented with a trophy made of waterford crystal, valued at $500. The trophy shattered when a member of Tkach's entourage dropped the box it was in while transporting it out of the arena.

Team career 
With the Russian national team Tkach won the European Championships in 2015 and 2017, with runner-up finishes in 2014 and 2016. Tkach was part of the European team that defeated the USA three times in a row in the first three editions of the Atlantic Challenge Cup (2015, 2016, 2017).

Titles & Achievements
 American Straight Pool Championship (2022)
 Super Billiards Expo Players Championship (2019)
 Euro Tour
 North Cyprus Open (2016)
 Portugal Open (2016)
 Albanian Open (2016)
 Italian Open (2018)
 Portugal Open (2018)
 Treviso Open (2018)
 Treviso Open (2019)
  Lasko Open (2021)
 European Pool Championship
 Eight-ball (2016, 2019)
 Straight pool 2017, 2019)
 Team (2015, 2017)
 Russian National Championship
 Straight Pool (2014, 2016, 2017)
 Ten-ball (2015, 2017)
 Eight-ball (2016, 2017)
 Nine-ball (2016, 2017)
 Atlantic Challenge Cup: (2015, 2016, 2017)
 WPA World Nine-ball Junior Championship (2017)

Notes

References

External links

 Kristina Tkatsch at kozoom.com
 Kristina Tkatsch on the website of Euro Tour
 Kristina Tkatsch on the website of European Pocket Billiard Federation

1999 births
Sportspeople from Moscow
Russian pool players
Living people
Female pool players